"17 Crimes" is a song by American rock band AFI. It was released as the second single from their ninth studio album Burials in 2013. It peaked at number 25 on the US Alternative Songs chart.

Track listing

Chart positions

References

External links 
17 Crimes Music Video on YouTube

2013 singles
2013 songs
AFI (band) songs
Songs written by Hunter Burgan
Songs written by Jade Puget
Songs written by Davey Havok
Songs written by Adam Carson